Puerto Rico Highway 108 (PR-108) is a road that travels from Mayagüez, Puerto Rico to Añasco. It begins at its intersection with PR-105 (Calle de la Candelaria) in downtown Mayagüez and ends at its junction with PR-109 in eastern Añasco, near Las Marías and San Sebastián. Near this road is located the Mayagüez Zoo.

Major intersections

Related route

Puerto Rico Highway 3108 (PR-3108) is a bypass road that branches off from PR-108 and ends at PR-2 north of the University of Puerto Rico at Mayagüez. This highway was officially designated as Paseo Juan Mari Brás.

See also

 List of highways numbered 108

References

External links

 Carretera 108, Las Marías, Puerto Rico

108